Thomas Skeffington may refer to:

Thomas Skeffington, 2nd Viscount Ferrard (1772–1843), Irish peer
Thomas Skeffington-Lodge (1905–1994), British Labour Party politician
Thomas Skeffington (MP) (1550-1600), English Member of Parliament for Leicestershire (UK Parliament constituency)
Thomas Skevington or Skeffington (died 1533), English Bishop of Bangor